In mathematics, the classifying space for the orthogonal group O(n) may be constructed as the Grassmannian of n-planes in an infinite-dimensional real space .

It is analogous to the classifying space for U(n).

Algebraic topology